Catholic High School Petaling Jaya (CHSPJ), more commonly known as SMJK Katholik or  公教中学 in Mandarin is a co-educational government Catholic missionary school in Petaling Jaya, Malaysia, formerly recognised as a Cluster School of Excellence by the Malaysian Ministry of Education. Founded in 1956 by Rev. Bro. Philippe Wu of the Marist Brothers. It has approximately 3000 students. Due to having the status of a Chinese conforming school, applicants are required to have taken Chinese paper for UPSR, also known as the Primary School Achievement Test. Mandarin paper is compulsory for all students and enrolment examinations such as PT3 and SPM.

Transportation

 Taman Jaya LRT station

Academics 
CHS achieved a 100% passing rate for Sijil Pelajaran Malaysia in the year 2011, with 5 12A students, 26 11A students, and 76 10A students in that particular year. Earlier in the year 2008, the school boasts 2 14A, 12 13A, 44 12A and 67 11A students in the SPM examinations. Khor Hui Yi was awarded Best Student for Selangor State in 2013 for achieving 10A+ in SPM. Mok Siao Chi was the best student of CHS, scoring 10A+ in the 2015 SPM exams. CHS emerged as the top school in PPD Petaling Utama in the 2016 SPM examination, with Iddhima Chong Hui Yi scoring 11A+ 1A and Eer Kai Jun scoring 10A+ and 1A being awarded top-scorers of Selangor.

The school achieved 100% passing rate for seven years consecutively since the year 2006 in the STPM exams.

Extracurricular activities

Sports 
CHS has made appearances in the arena of ultimate frisbee. In 2006, CHS competed in the UM Open, sending three teams (one Open, one Men's Novice, one Women's Novice). In 2007, CHS sent a few representatives to join All Star at the Valley Ultimate's Hard-Core Ultimate Frisbee and also sent five teams to make a clean sweep at the Subang Jaya Community Youth Under-18 Ultimate Open. In 2008, CHS competed in competitions such as the UiTM Open, where the team received the title of Most Promising Team and Taylor's Ultimate Mini.

The cheerleading team for Catholic High is Calyx. They won the Best Dressed award, Best Make Up award and also Second Runner Up for the Cheer2009 national cheerleading championships. The team put in a brilliant performance to finish second in the All-Girls category in Cheer 2015. In Cheer 2018, Calyx All Girls from SMJK Katholik overcame an eight-time winner to clinch the top prize. It broke the winning streak of defending champions, Cyrens from Sri Kuala Lumpur, which had been No.1 for eight years. Calyx captain Tung Mei Yee, was elated that their hard work paid off.

Science and mathematics 
Foong Yake Ho and Liew Chien Hao represented Malaysia to compete in the 39th International Mathematical Olympiad in Taipei, Taiwan in the year 1998. In the same year, Foong won a bronze medal in the Asian-Pacific Mathematical Olympiad while Liew won a bronze medal in the Southeast Asia Mathematical Olympiad. In the following year, both Foong and Liew represented Malaysia in the 40th Mathematical Olympiad held in Bucharest, Romania. They won a consolation prize and bronze medal respectively in the Asia-Pacific Mathematical Olympiad held in 1999.

The 2nd Sunway University College Inter-School Math Quiz Challenge 2007 Finals held at Sunway University College was won by Form 5 CHS students Cheong Tee Jin, Bryan Chong Hau Foo, and Tan Jing Lynn. Cheong Tee Jin represented Malaysia in the International Math Olympiad in Slovenia in the year 2006.

Catholic High student Tham Ying Hong represented Malaysia and won the Silver Award in the 51st International Mathematic Olympiad organized by the Ministry of Education and Science of the Republic of Kazakhstan in the year 2010. In the year 2011, he won the gold medal in the Australian Mathematics Competition, gold medal in the 23rd Asia Pacific Mathematics Olympiad and bronze medal in the 52nd International Mathematical Olympiad in Amsterdam, Netherlands.

Yeoh Chin Vern is the bronze medalist in the 2013 44th International Physics Olympiad held in Copenhagen, Denmark.

A team of three boys from Catholic High School PJ won a gold medal in the lower secondary category of the 2019 World Robot Olympiad held in Győr, Hungary. They built a diagnostic and surgical robot.

Music and dance 
SMJK Katholik emerged champion in the 2005 National Level High School Brass Band Competition held in Penang. Education Ministry general Tan Sri said SMJK Katholik had set a very high standard in brass performance for others to use as a benchmark.

The school band won the Silver Award in the Singapore International Band Festival in 2010 organized by the Wind Bands Association of Singapore. From 29 November 2011 to 3 December 2011, the Catholic High School Band participated in the international 3rd Winter Band Festival 2011 at Hong Kong Disneyland Resort, and won a Gold Award. The CHS Band was also the first Malaysian band to perform in the Art of Animation Studio, Disneyland, Hong Kong.

Arts and design 
A team of students from Catholic High took the champion title in the national Built Environment Explained Competition 2013 organized by Taylor's University, winning a total cash prize of RM 2800. The theme given on that year was Designing Better Classrooms.

Debate 
CHS Chinese Debate team won the Championship in the National Secondary School Chinese Debate Competition in the years 1999, 2001, 2002 and 2003.

Business 
In the year 2016, one team from CHS was inaugurated as national champions in the FedEx-Amcham International Trade Challenge,

Notable alumni

 Tan Sri William Cheng - Chairman of The Lion Group
 Eric Lim Kin Fai 林健辉 -  Malaysian artist-singer
 Edmund Yeo 杨毅恒 - film director
 David Koon 庄慰义 - music producer and arranger
 Xandria Ooi - Hitz.tv VJ, journalist, emcee, host
 Koe Yeet 高艺 - Malaysian artist-singer
 Yeoh Li Tian - National chess player
 Victor Gu 胡渐彪 - National debater, politician, host

Sister schools
 Saint Joseph's Institution, Singapore

References

External links
 SMJK Schools in Malaysia (SMJK Katholik) 
 Catholic High School official page
 SMJK Web Portal 2.0 

Secondary schools in Malaysia
Secondary schools in Selangor
Chinese-language schools in Malaysia
1956 establishments in Malaya
Educational institutions established in 1956
Catholic schools in Malaysia
Marist Brothers schools